Jo McDonnell is an American actress.

McDonnell is perhaps best known for films and television series as The Octagon, Spiker, Semi-Tough, Dallas, T. J. Hooker and her role as the new Marilyn Munster in the 1981 television film The Munsters' Revenge.

References

External links

Living people
1950 births
American television actresses
American film actresses
21st-century American women